Kaspar Hauser (30 April 1812 – 17 December 1833) was a German youth who claimed to have grown up in the total isolation of a darkened cell. Hauser's claims, and his subsequent death from a stab wound to his left breast, sparked much debate and controversy. Theories propounded at the time identified him as a member of the grand ducal House of Baden, hidden away because of royal intrigue. These opinions may or may not have been documented by later investigations. Other theories proposed that Hauser had been a fraud.

History

First appearance 
On 26 May 1828, a teenage boy appeared in the streets of Nuremberg, Germany. He carried a letter with him addressed to the captain of the 4th squadron of the 6th cavalry regiment, Captain von Wessenig. Its heading read: 

The anonymous author said that the boy was given into his custody as an infant on 7 October 1812 and that he instructed him in reading, writing and the Christian religion, but never let him "take a single step out of my house." The letter stated that the boy would now like to be a cavalryman "as his father was" and invited the captain either to take him in or to hang him.

There was another short letter enclosed, purporting to be from his mother to his prior caretaker. It stated that his name was Kaspar, that he was born on 30 April 1812 and that his father, a cavalryman of the 6th regiment, was dead. In fact, this letter was found to have been written by the same hand as the other one (whose line "he writes my handwriting exactly as I do" led later analysts to assume that Kaspar Hauser himself wrote both of them).

A shoemaker named Weickmann took the boy to the house of Captain von Wessenig, where he would repeat only the words "I want to be a cavalryman, as my father was" and "Horse! Horse!" Further demands elicited only tears or the obstinate proclamation of "Don't know." He was taken to a police station, where he would write a name: Kaspar Hauser. He showed that he was familiar with money, could say some prayers and read a little, but he answered few questions and his vocabulary appeared to be rather limited. Because he provided no account of himself, he was imprisoned as a vagabond.

He spent the following two months in Luginsland Tower in Nuremberg Castle in the care of a jailer named Andreas Hiltel. Despite what many later accounts would say, he was in good physical condition and could walk well; for example, he climbed over 90 steps to his room. He was of a "healthy facial complexion" and approximately 16 years old, but appeared to be intellectually impaired. Mayor Binder, however, claimed that the boy had an excellent memory and was learning quickly. Various curious people visited him to his apparent delight. He refused all food except bread and water.

Hauser's account of life in a dungeon 
At first, it was assumed that Hauser was a half-wild child from the forests. During the course of many conversations with Mayor Binder, Hauser told a different version of his past life, which he later wrote down in more detail. According to the story, Hauser had as long as he could remember spent his life in solitary confinement in a darkened cell. He gave the cell's dimensions as approximately two metres long, one metre wide and one and a half high, with only a straw bed to sleep on and, for toys, two horses and a dog carved out of wood.

Hauser claimed that he found rye bread and water next to his bed each morning. At times, the water would taste bitter and drinking it would cause him to sleep more deeply than usual. On such occasions, upon awakening, his straw had been changed and his hair and nails cut. Hauser claimed that the first human being he had ever met was a man who visited him not long before his release. The man took great care not to reveal his face to him. This man taught him to write his own name by leading his hand. After learning to stand and walk, Hauser was brought to Nuremberg. The stranger allegedly taught him to say the phrase "I want to be a cavalryman, as my father was" (in Old Bavarian dialect), but Hauser claimed that he did not understand what the words meant.

This tale aroused great curiosity and made Hauser an object of international attention. Rumours arose that he was of princely parentage, possibly of Baden origin, but there were also allegations that he was an impostor.

Further life in Nuremberg 
Paul Johann Anselm Ritter von Feuerbach, president of the Bavarian court of appeals, began to investigate the case. Hauser was formally adopted by the town of Nuremberg and money was donated for his upkeep and education. He was given into the care of Friedrich Daumer, a schoolmaster and speculative philosopher, who taught him various subjects and who thereby discovered his talent for drawing. He appeared to flourish in this environment. Daumer also subjected him to homeopathy and magnetic experiments. As Feuerbach told the story, "When Professor Daumer held the north pole [of a magnet] towards him, Kaspar put his hand to the pit of his stomach, and, drawing his waistcoat in an outward direction, said that it drew him thus; and that a current of air seemed to proceed from him. The south pole affected him less powerfully; and he said that it blew upon him."

The wound 
On 17 October 1829, Hauser was found in the cellar of Daumer's house bleeding from a newly cut wound on the forehead. He asserted that while sitting on the privy, he had been attacked and hurt by a hooded man who also threatened him with the words: "You still have to die before you leave the city of Nuremberg." Hauser related he recognised the speaker as the man who had brought him to Nuremberg. As was obvious from his blood trail, Hauser at first fled to the first floor where his room was, but then, rather than moving on to find his caretakers, had gone downstairs and climbed through a trap door into the cellar. Alarmed officials called for a police escort and transferred him to the care of Johann Biberbach, a municipal authority. The alleged attack on Hauser also fueled rumours about his possible ancestry from Hungary, England or the House of Baden.

Doubters of Hauser's story are of the opinion that he had self-inflicted the wound with a razor, which he then took back to his room before going to the cellar. He might have done so to arouse pity and thus escape chiding for a recent quarrel with Daumer, who had come to believe that the boy had a tendency to lie.

The pistol accident 
On 3 April 1830, a pistol shot went off in Hauser's room at the Biberbachs' house. His escort hurriedly entered the room and found him bleeding from a wound to the right side of his head. Hauser soon revived and stated that he climbed on a chair to get some books, the chair had fallen, and then, while trying to find a handhold, he had by mistake torn down the pistol hanging on the wall and caused the shot to go off. There are doubts whether the superficial wound was actually caused by the shot. Some authors associate the incident with a preceding quarrel in which, again, Hauser had been reproached for lying. Whatever the case, the occurrence led the municipal authorities to come to another decision on Hauser, whose initially good relationship with the Biberbach family had soured. In May 1830, he was transferred to the house of Baron von Tucher. The baron also would later complain about Hauser's exorbitant vanity and lies. Mrs. Biberbach commented on his "horrendous mendacity" and "art of dissimulation" and called him "full of vanity and spite".

Lord Stanhope 
A British nobleman, Lord Stanhope, took an interest in Hauser and gained custody of him late in 1831. He spent a great deal of money attempting to clarify Hauser's origin. In particular, he paid for two visits to Hungary hoping to jog the boy's memory, as Hauser seemed to remember some Hungarian words and had once declared that the Hungarian Countess Maytheny was his mother. Hauser failed to recognise any buildings or monuments in Hungary. A Hungarian nobleman who had met Hauser later told Stanhope that he and his son had a good laugh when they recollected the strange boy and his histrionic behaviour. Stanhope later wrote that the complete failure of these inquiries led him to doubt Hauser's credibility. In December 1831, he transferred Hauser to Ansbach, to the care of a schoolmaster named Johann Georg Meyer, and in January 1832, Stanhope left Hauser for good. Stanhope continued to pay for Hauser's living expenses but never made good on his promise that he would take him to England. After Hauser's death, Stanhope published a book in which he presented all known evidence against Hauser, taking it as his "duty openly to confess that I had been deceived." Followers of Hauser suspect Stanhope of ulterior motives and connections to the House of Baden, but academic historiography defends him as a philanthropist, a pious man and a seeker of truth.

Life and death in Ansbach 
Schoolmaster Meyer, a strict and pedantic man, disliked Hauser's excuses and apparent lies. Their relationship was thus strained. In late 1832, Hauser was employed as a copyist in the local law office. Still hoping that Stanhope would take him to England, Hauser was dissatisfied with his situation, which deteriorated further when his patron, Anselm von Feuerbach, died in May 1833. This was a grievous loss to him. Other authors point out that Feuerbach, by the end of his life, had lost faith in Hauser. He had written a note, to be found in his legacy, which read, "Caspar Hauser is a smart scheming codger, a rogue, a good-for-nothing that ought to be killed." However, there is no indication that Feuerbach, already seriously ill, let Hauser feel this change of opinion.

On 9 December 1833, Hauser had a serious argument with Meyer. Lord Stanhope was expected to visit Ansbach at Christmas and Meyer stated that he did not know how he would face him.

Fatal stab wound 

Five days later, on 14 December 1833, Hauser came home with a deep wound in his left breast. By his account, he had been lured to the Ansbach Court Garden, where a stranger stabbed him while giving him a bag. When policeman Herrlein searched the Court Garden, he found a small violet purse containing a pencilled note in Spiegelschrift (mirror writing). The message read, in German:

"Hauser will be able to tell you quite precisely how I look and from where I am. To save Hauser the effort, I want to tell you myself from where I come _ _ . I come  _ _ _ the Bavarian border _ _ On the river _ _ _ _ _ I will even tell you the name: M. L. Ö."

Hauser died of the wound on 17 December 1833.

Inconsistencies in Hauser's account led the Ansbach court of enquiry to suspect that he had stabbed himself and then invented a tale about being attacked. The note in the purse that was found in the Court Garden contained a spelling error and a grammatical error, both of which were typical for Hauser, who, on his deathbed, muttered incoherently about "writing with pencil". Although Hauser was eager that the purse be found, he did not ask for its contents. The note itself was folded into a specific triangular form, in the way in which Hauser would fold his letters, according to Mrs. Meyer. Forensic examiners agreed that the wound might indeed be self-inflicted. Many authors believe that he had wounded himself in a bid to revive public interest in his story and to persuade Stanhope to fulfill his promise to take him to England, but that he had injured himself more deeply than planned.

Burial 

Hauser was buried in the Stadtfriedhof (city cemetery) in Ansbach, where his headstone reads, in Latin, "Here lies Kaspar Hauser, riddle of his time. His birth was unknown, his death mysterious. 1833." A monument to him was later erected in the Court Garden which reads , meaning "Here lies a mysterious one who was killed in a mysterious manner."

Medical opinions 
Dr. Heidenreich, a physician present at the autopsy, claimed that the brain of Kaspar Hauser was notable for small cortical size and its few non-distinct cortical gyri, indicative to some that he suffered from cortical atrophy or, as G. Hesse argued, from epilepsy. Heidenreich may have been influenced by his phrenological ideas when examining Hauser's brain. Dr. Albert, who conducted the autopsy and wrote the official report, found no anomalies in Hauser's brain.

A 1928 medical study supported the view that Hauser had self-inflicted the wound and accidentally stabbed himself too deeply. A 2005 forensic analysis argued that it seems "unlikely that the stab to the chest was inflicted exclusively for the purpose of self-damage, but both a suicidal stab and a homicidal act (assassination) cannot be definitely ruled out."

Psychological viewpoints 
Hauser's various accounts of the story of his incarceration include several contradictions. In 1970, psychiatrist Karl Leonhard stated that "If he had been living since childhood under the conditions he describes, he would not have developed beyond the condition of an idiot; indeed he would not have remained alive long. His tale is so full of absurdities that it is astonishing that it was ever believed and is even today still believed by many people."

Karl Leonhard rejected the views of both Heidenreich and Hesse. He contended that "Kaspar Hauser was, as other authors already opined, a pathological swindler. In addition to his hysterical make-up he probably had the persistence of a paranoid personality since he was able to play his role so imperturbably. From many reports on his behaviour one can recognise the hysterical as well as the paranoid trend of his personality."

"Hereditary prince" theory

Rumors

According to contemporary rumours, probably current as early as 1829, Kaspar Hauser was, in fact, the hereditary prince of Baden, who was born 29 September 1812. According to history, the prince died on 16 October 1812. It was alleged that he had been switched with a dying infant, only to subsequently surface 16 years later as Hauser. In that case, Hauser's parents would have been Charles, Grand Duke of Baden and Stéphanie de Beauharnais, cousin by marriage and adopted daughter of Napoleon. As Charles had no surviving male progeny, his successor was his uncle, Louis, who was later succeeded by his half-brother, Leopold. Leopold's mother, the Countess of Hochberg, was the alleged culprit for the plot. The Countess was supposed to have disguised herself as a ghost, the "White Lady," when kidnapping the prince. Her motive, evidently, would have been to secure the succession for her sons.

Following Hauser's death, it was further claimed that he was murdered, again to hide his supposed true identity. Since Hauser was unmarried and childless when he was stabbed to death in 1833, this heavily disputed claim joined with the actual succession laws of male-only primogeniture, as practiced in the Grand Duchy.

Evidence uncovered in the 1870s 
In 1876, Otto Mittelstädt presented evidence against this theory, in the form of official documents concerning the prince's emergency baptism, autopsy and burial. In his Historical Mysteries, Andrew Lang summarises the results: "It is true that the Grand Duchess was too ill to be permitted to see her dead baby, in 1812, but the baby's father, grandmother, and aunt, with the ten Court physicians, the nurses and others, must have seen it, in death, and it is too absurd to suppose, on no authority, that they were all parties to the White Lady's plot." Historian Fritz Trautz went so far as to write that, "The silly fairytale, which to this day moves many pens and has found much belief, was fully disproved in Otto Mittelstädt's book." Letters of the Grand Duke's mother, published in 1951, give detailed accounts of the child's birth, illness and death, which would disprove the theory of switched babies.

Differing DNA analyses 
In November 1996, the German magazine Der Spiegel reported an attempt to genetically match a blood sample from underwear thought to have been Hauser's. This analysis was made in laboratories of Forensic Science Service in Birmingham and in the LMU Institute of Legal Medicine at the University of Munich. Comparisons with descendants of the princely family proved that the blood examined could not have come from the hereditary prince of Baden.

In 2002, the Institute for Forensic Medicine of the University of Münster analyzed hair and body cells from locks of hair and items of clothing that also belonged to Kaspar Hauser. The analysts took from the items used in the test six different DNA samples, all of which turned out to be identical. All, however, differed substantially from the blood sample examined in 1996, the authenticity of which was therefore questioned. The new DNA samples were compared to a mitochondrial DNA segment from Astrid von Medinger née von Zallinger zu Stillendorf (1954-2002), a female line descendant of Kaspar's supposed younger sister Princess Josephine of Baden through her granddaughter Princess Joséphine Caroline of Belgium. Since mitochondrial DNA passes only through the female line it cannot change except through mutation and so a brother of Josephine should be, if not identical, at least close to identical.

The sequences were not identical, but the deviation observed is not large enough to exclude a relationship as the difference could be caused by a mutation during the previous generations.  On the other hand, the relatively high similarity by no means proves the alleged relationship, as the "Hauser samples" showed a pattern amongst the German population.

The House of Baden does not allow any medical examination of the remains of Stéphanie de Beauharnais or of the child that was buried as her son in the family vault at the Pforzheimer Schlosskirche.

Cultural references 

Kaspar Hauser fits into the contemporary European image of the "wolf child" (despite the fact that he almost certainly was not one), and he became possibly the best-known example of the genre. As a result, his story inspired numerous works.

Literature 
Herman Melville, in "The Confidence Man," published in 1857, has an anonymous member of a crowd, casting about for an identity for a "stranger," evidently a deaf mute, suggest he may be "Casper Hauser".

Kaspar Hauser inspired the French poet Paul Verlaine to write the poem "Gaspard Hauser chante", in which he sees himself as Gaspard, published in his book Sagesse (1880).

Perhaps the most influential fictional treatment of Kasper Hauser was Jakob Wassermann's 1908 novel Caspar Hauser oder Die Trägheit des Herzens (Caspar Hauser or the Inertia of the Heart), which was largely responsible for its popularity in Germany.

In 1913, Georg Trakl wrote the poem "Kaspar Hauser Lied" ("Kaspar Hauser Song"). It alludes to the works by Verlaine and Wassermann, and has been called the "most striking" expression of a literary trope in which Kaspar Hauser "stood for the natural, poetic genius lost in a strange world, lacking a home, a sense of origin and attachment, and fearing a violent but uncertain future." Martin Heidegger cited this poem in his essay on poetry and language, Unterwegs zur Sprache.

In 1963, Marianne Hauser gave a fictional account of Kaspar Hauser's life in her novel Prince Ishmael.

In 1967, the Austrian playwright Peter Handke published his play Kaspar.

In 1994 the English poet David Constantine explored the story and its personae in Caspar Hauser: A Poem in Nine Cantos.

Hauser is referenced briefly in Ted Chiang's 2000 short story "The Evolution of Human Science."

Canadian artist Diane Obomsawin tells the story of Kaspar Hauser in her 2007 graphic novel Kaspar and later adapted it into an animated short film of the same title in 2012.

German journalist, satirist, and writer Kurt Tucholsky used Kaspar Hauser as one of several pseudonyms.

Film and television 
Michael Landon played Casper Hauser in the episode "The Mystery Of Caspar Hauser" of the television series Telephone Time in 1956.

In 1974, the German filmmaker Werner Herzog made Hauser's story into the film, Jeder für sich und Gott gegen alle ("Every Man for Himself and God Against All"). In English, the film was either known by that translation, or by the title The Enigma of Kaspar Hauser. The film includes the main known features of Hauser's life, though it omits most of his changes of location and career. It does not question his veracity.

La leggenda di Kaspar Hauser (2012, Davide Manuli) is a surreal drama based on "the legend" of Kaspar Hauser. In this modern western-like re-interpretation featuring Vincent Gallo, a music-obsessive Kaspar washes up on a Mediterranean beach, where half a dozen protagonists try to make sense of who he is.

Music 
Hauser's story has inspired numerous musical references. There have been at least two operas named after him, a 2007 work by American composer Elizabeth Swados and a 2010 work by British composer Rory Boyle.  

In 1987, Suzanne Vega wrote "Wooden Horse (Caspar Hauser's Song)", based on how she imagined Hauser's experiences when he emerged from the dungeon.

In 1994, then director and choreographer of the Saarbrücken Staatstheater Ballet in Germany, used the Hauser story as the basis for the ballet Kaspar Hauser, which she presented at the Saarbrücken Staatstheater.

Non-fiction 
In his later years, Paul Johann Anselm Ritter von Feuerbach took a deep interest in the fate of Kaspar Hauser. He was the first to publish a critical summary of the ascertained facts, under the title of Kaspar Hauser, ein Beispiel eines Verbrechens am Seelenleben (1832).

There was a January 1861 Atlantic Monthly unsigned article on Kaspar Hauser. Circulated among the American intellectual establishment of the time, it provides a sense of perspective on many of the issues firing the debate about "Who Was Kaspar Hauser?" which continues to this day.

A brief discussion of Kaspar Hauser appears in the "Physiology" chapter of the editions of Mary Baker Eddy's Science and Health (published 1875–1910).

Anthroposophists have written several books on Kaspar Hauser. One in particular, a detailed work by Peter Tradowsky, addresses the mysteries surrounding Kaspar Hauser's life from the anthroposophical point of view. His analysis delves into the occult significance of the individuality he sees as incarnated in Kaspar Hauser.

In 1996 Jeffrey Moussaieff Masson wrote Lost Prince: The Unsolved Mystery of Kaspar Hauser (1996).

 In a "Kaspar Hauser experiment", a nonhuman animal is reared isolated from members of its own species, in an attempt at determining which behaviors are innate.

See also
List of unsolved deaths
Man in the Iron Mask

References

Sources

Further reading 

 Anselm von Feuerbach: Caspar Hauser. Boston 1832.
 Philip Henry Earl Stanhope: Tracts Relating to Caspar Hauser. Hodson 1836.
 
 Catherine Lucy Wilhelmina (Stanhope) Powlett, Duchess of Cleveland: The True Story of Kaspar Hauser from Official Documents. Macmillan, London, 1893.
 Andrew Lang: The Mystery of Kaspar Hauser (in: Historical Mysteries, 1905).
 Ivo Striedinger: Hauser Kaspar, der „rätselhafte Findling“, in: Lebensläufe aus Franken, III. vol., 1927, pp. 199–215. 
 Ivo Striedinger: Neues Schrifttum über Kaspar Hauser. In: Zeitschrift für bayerische Landesgeschichte, 6. Vol. 1933, pp. 415–484. 
 Jean Mistler: Gaspard Hauser, un drame de la personnalité. Fayard 1971.  
 Fritz Trautz: Zum Problem der Persönlichkeitsdeutung: Anläßlich das Kaspar-Hauser-Buches von Jean Mistler. In: Francia 2, 1974, pp. 715–731. 
 Martin Kitchen: Kaspar Hauser: Europe's Child. Palgrave MacMillan 2001.

External links 

  Livres audio mp3 gratuits 'Gaspard Hauser chante' de Paul Verlaine - (Association Audiocité).

1810s births
1833 deaths
19th-century German people
Date of birth unknown
Deaths by stabbing in Germany
Forteana
 
Unidentified people
Unsolved deaths
Year of birth uncertain